Peckoltia compta is a species of catfish in the family Loricariidae. It is native to South America, where it occurs in the Tapajós basin in Brazil. The species reaches 6.2 cm (2.4 inches) SL. It was described in 2010 by Renildo Ribeiro de Oliveira and Jansen Zuanon (of the National Institute of Amazonian Research), Lúcia Rapp Py-Daniel, and Marcelo Salles Rocha (of Amazonas State University) primarily on the basis of coloration and patterning. Its specific epithet, compta, is stated to be derived from the Latin word for "adorned" or "ornamented", referring to the species' distinctive color pattern.

P. compta appears in the aquarium trade, where it is referred to either as the leopard frog pleco or by its associated L-number, which is L-134.

References 

Ancistrini
Freshwater fish of Brazil
Fish described in 2010